Sandor Rivnyak (October 31, 1937 – January 22, 2020) was an American former handball player who competed in the 1972 Summer Olympics and in the 1976 Summer Olympics. He was born in Dunaföldvár, Hungary. In 1972, he was part of the American team which finished 14th in the Olympic tournament. He played all five matches. Four years later, he finished tenth with the American team in the 1976 Olympic tournament. He played all five matches again. He played for the Adelphi University.

References

External links
 profile

1937 births
2020 deaths
American male handball players
Olympic handball players of the United States
Handball players at the 1972 Summer Olympics
Handball players at the 1976 Summer Olympics
Hungarian emigrants to the United States
People from Dunaföldvár